Mayna is a genus of shrubs and trees in the family Achariaceae. It is native to the American tropics. It is dioecious, with male and female flowers produced on separate individuals.

Taxonomy 
The following species are currently recognized:
 Mayna grandifolia (H. Karst.) Warb.
 Mayna hystricina (Gleason) Sleumer
 Mayna odorata Aubl.
 Mayna parvifolia (J.F. Macbr.) Sleumer
 Mayna pubescens (Triana & H. Karst.) Warb.
 Mayna suaveolens (Triana & H. Karst.) Warb.

References 

 
Malpighiales genera
Dioecious plants